
Gmina Pelplin is an urban-rural gmina (administrative district) in Tczew County, Pomeranian Voivodeship, in northern Poland.

Villages
Apart from the town of Pelplin, Gmina Pelplin contains the villages and settlements of Bielawki, Dębina, Gaj, Gręblin, Hilarowo, Janiszewko, Janiszewo, Janowo, Kulice, Kulice Małe, Lignowy Szlacheckie, Małe Walichnowy, Maniowo, Międzyłęż, Młynik, Nadleśnictwo, Nowy Dwór Pelpliński, Nowy Międzyłęż, Ornasowo, Pelplin-Wybudowanie, Pomyje, Pustki, Rajkowy, Rombark, Ropuchy, Rożental, Rudno, Rudnopole, Stary Międzyłęż, Stocki Młyn, Wielki Garc and Wola.

Neighbouring gminas
Gmina Pelplin is bordered by the gminas of Bobowo, Gniew, Miłoradz, Morzeszczyn, Starogard Gdański, Subkowy and Sztum.

References
Polish official population figures 2006

Pelplin
Tczew County